The Palazzo San Callisto (also known as the Palace of Saint Callixtus) is a Baroque palace in the Trastevere neighborhood of Rome and one of the extraterritorial Properties of the Holy See. The original Palazzo is located in the Piazza di Santa Maria in Trastevere, the later extensions have their entrance in Piazza di San Callisto. The entire complex is one of the areas of the Holy See regulated by the 1929 Lateran Treaty signed with the Kingdom of Italy. As such it has extraterritorial status.

In the courtyard of the palace is the well where, according to tradition, Pope Callixtus I was martyred in the year 222.

History 

The palace was originally the residence of the titular cardinals of the Basilica of Santa Maria in Trastevere and was renovated in the 16th century under Cardinal Giovanni Morone by architect Orazio Torriani. Pope Paul V granted the palace to the monks of the  Order of St. Benedict who had to leave their previous monastery due to an extension of the Quirinal Palace. The building took the name of the small adjacent church of San Callisto. Between 1610 and 1618 both the church and the convent were renovated.   

In 1936 during the pontificate of Pope Pius XI the architect Giuseppe Momo, known for the double helix staircase of the Vatican Museums, designed the construction of a new wing. 

One facade of the palace faces the celebrated Fountain in Piazza Santa Maria in Trastevere.

In 1990, the Palazzo was placed on the UNESCO World Heritage Register.

Current Use 

It currently serves as home to:

The Dicastery for Promoting Integral Human Development
The Dicastery for the Laity, Family and Life
Caritas Internationalis
The International Catholic Charismatic Renewal Services
 Circolo San Pietro
 Scholas Occurentes
 Other Catholic organisations that are part of or directly linked to the Holy See.
 Residences of prelates and other Roman Curia officials

See also

Properties of the Holy See
Pope Callixtus I
Church of St. Callixtus
Pope Paul V
Giovanni Morone
Orazio Torriani
Pope Pius XI
Santa Maria in Trastevere
Trastevere

References

Callisto
Extraterritorial properties of the Holy See in Rome
Pontifical Council Cor Unum